State Route 835 (SR 835) is an east–west state highway in Montgomery and Greene counties in Ohio, United States.

Route description

State Route 835 connects to U.S. Route 35 (US 35)on both ends, starting at that route's interchange with Woodman Drive (C-74) approximately 4½ miles east of Downtown Dayton. From there it turns north onto Research Boulevard which gradually turns to the east and follows to the route's terminus at the US 35 interchange with North Fairfield Road (C-9) in Beavercreek. SR 835 does not intersect with any other state highways.

Major intersections

See also

References

External links

835
Beavercreek, Ohio
Transportation in Montgomery County, Ohio
Transportation in Greene County, Ohio
1987 establishments in Ohio